Manuok is an American solo musical project founded in San Diego, California, United States, in 2004 by Scott Mercado (Manuok).  Scott Mercado (not of Candlebox) (born January 22, 1976) is an American musician, songwriter, and multi-instrumentalist. He was born in Montrose, Scotland and currently resides in San Diego. He is currently a member of Manuok, Sara Lov, Mr. Tube, and Via Satellite and Venice, Italy's Grimoon. His primary instruments are vocals, guitar, keys, and drums – but has appeared on organ, percussion, glockenspiel, and bass.  He has recorded internationally alongside The Album Leaf, Horse-Stories (Australia – Europe), Mr. Tube, Maquiladora (Acuarela – Spain), The Soft Lightes (Modular), Pilotram (Transient Frequency – USA), Trost (Minty Fresh, Four Music), Tristeza (Better Looking, Bella Union), Devics (Filter, Bella Union), Via Satellite (Loud and Clear – USA, Human Highway – Japan), Grimoon (Italy), and many more.  He is also an accomplished recording engineer, recently recording Grimoon's (Venice, Italy) "Super 8".

History

Inception
Manuok officially began in 2004 as the solo project of Scott, guitarist for San Diego-based post-rock instrumental band Via Satellite. Mercado has also performed in several other San Diego-area bands, including The Black Heart Procession, Tristeza, Maquiladora, Devics, Sara Lov, Grimoon, The Incredible Moses Leroy, Ilya, Team Abraham, low cloud cover, and pilotram (Duane Pitre)

Self Titled
In between tours and recording with The Black Heart Procession, The Album Leaf, and Via Satellite, Scott Mercado began recording material at home.  When Drew Andrews and Tim Reece began spending more time with The Album Leaf, Scott's label Loud and Clear (owned by Brad Lee asked for more material.  The album was followed by a tour opening for The Album Leaf and then later with The Black Heart Procession.  Torrance, RandB, and Aheadwithnobody were featured in television Bulbo.  Maria Oden (as well as unreleased songs) we featured in the film Almost Romeo. NoMeToucherPas was featured in the film The Duty of Living.

No End To Limitations
Following the release of the first record and touring, Scott's toured constantally in the bands Devics, The Black Heart Procession and Tristeza for a period of three/four years.  In between tours and recording, Manuok recorded and toured as much as possible.  Parts of the album were recorded in Berlin, San Diego, Italy, and East Los Angeles where Scott recorded his grandfather telling stories.  Scott's grandfather Francisco Mercado, Jr. (and his passing) would become a large influence on his next two records.  During this same time, signed to San Francisco's 500 Records and Venice, Italy's Macaco Records.

The Old Horse
In the midst of touring more in Europe with Sara Lov and manuok, Scott recorded The Old Horse.  Released in 2010 on 500 Records and Macaco Records, this album is the last to feature the voice of Scott's grandfather. This album features mostly softer material featuring the pump organ, piano, and acoustic guitar.  The song "Carcerate" was used in the documentary Scribble 08 and "Untitled" was featured on the Sigur Rós website.

Scribble 08 
In Nov 2009, Scott recorded a soundtrack for the art documentary Scribble 08 featuring interviews with Jeff Soto, Camille Rose Garcia, Joe Sorren, and more.

Traps
Traps was released in 2013 by Macaco Records (Italy), 500 Records (USA), and Kilk Records (Japan).  Written during and between national and international tours,  "Traps" is much heavier than previous albums  and is the first album recorded almost entirely with the touring band.

Live band members 
Current
Scott Peter Mercado – producer, engineer, mixing, instrumentation
Erik Berg – bass, vocals
Geoff Hill, drums, glockenspiel
Jeff Grasmick, drums, guitar, gass, glockenspiel
Andrew Trecha, guitar
Former
Brad Lee
Matt Mournian
Dario Izzarious
Russel White
Sean Taugher
Jarrod Chilton

Discography

Albums
Self-Titled Loud and Clear Records, 2005
No End To Limitations 500 Records Three Ring Records, Macaco Records, 2009
The Old Horse 500 Records Three Ring Records, Macaco Records, 2010
Traps 500 Records Kilk Records Macaco Records, 2013

Compilation appearances
San Diego Is Burning Loud And Clear, 2004

TV and film uses
 "Torrance" was featured in television Un Paso for Bulbo TV.
 "RandB" was featured in television Un Paso for Bulbo TV.
 "Aheadwithnobody" was featured in television Un Paso for Bulbo TV.
 "Maria Oden" was featured in Almost Romeo.
 "NoMeToucherPas" was featured in the film The Duty of Living.
 "Carcerate" was used in Scribble 08
 "Nc" was featured in the short documentary "Four Sisters."

References

External links

Official sites
 Manuok official website
 Manuok at 500 Records
 Manuok at Macaco Records

Interviews 
 (September 2012)
 (April 2011)
 (October 13, 2010)
 (December 2008)
 (September 2005)

Three Ring Records artists
Musical groups from San Diego
Folktronica musicians
American post-rock groups